Corporate Avenger was an American nu metal band from Southern California.

History 

The idea for the band Corporate Avenger was born some time between 1995 and 1996 when brothers, Spike and Brad Xavier were on tour in the band Humble Gods. Years later, Spike met with Marco of 1605 Studio in Huntington Beach, California, and recorded some songs. In 1999, these songs were released on Suburban Noize Records as the Taxes are Stealing EP. This EP featured the first song ever recorded by the group, "Evolve", a song questioning the origins of the native peoples of the Americas.

At the time of the EP, the band consisted of eight members, including Pakelika of the Kottonmouth Kings, and other members of 20 Dead Flower Children and No Doubt. During this phase of the band's history, the group had an ever-changing lineup and no two shows would be alike.

In 2000, the group released a CD titled The New Testament, which featured new songs as well as three songs from the previous EP. It also featured a new lineup including the first appearance of vocalist Adawee the Wind.

2005 saw the release of the Born Again CD and also saw the departure of the Taxman.

Discography 
 Taxes Are Stealing EP (2000)
 The New Testament (2000)
 Freedom Is a State of Mind (2001)
 Born Again (2005)

References

External links 

Musical groups from Orange County, California
Nu metal musical groups from California